"Leave It Alone" is a song by American rock band Living Colour from their third album, Stain. In 1994, the song was nominated for Best Hard Rock Performance at the 36th Annual Grammy Awards.

Charts

References

Living Colour songs
1993 singles
1993 songs
Epic Records singles
Songs written by Corey Glover
Songs written by Doug Wimbish
Songs written by Vernon Reid